Odontotermes taprobanes, is a species of termite of the genus Odontotermes. It is native to India and Sri Lanka.

References

External links
 

Termites
Insects described in 1853
Insects of India